Edmond Cloetens was a Belgian archer and Olympic champion. He competed at the 1920 Summer Olympics in Antwerp, where he won an individual gold medal in fixed target (large birds), and also two gold medals with the Belgian team.

Note
Some sources list his name as Emile Cloetens, while most sources have Edmond Cloetens.

References

Belgian male archers
Olympic archers of Belgium
Archers at the 1920 Summer Olympics
Olympic gold medalists for Belgium
Year of death missing
Olympic medalists in archery
Year of birth missing
Medalists at the 1920 Summer Olympics
20th-century Belgian people